James Darrell Duffie (born May 23, 1954) is a Canadian financial economist and is Dean Witter Distinguished Professor of Finance at Stanford Graduate School of Business.

He is the author of numerous research articles, and several books, including Futures Markets, Dynamic Asset Pricing Theory, and—with Kenneth Singleton—Credit Risk.

Duffie has been on the finance faculty at Stanford since 1984. He is a Fellow and member of the Council of the Econometric Society, a Research Associate of the National Bureau of Economic Research, a member of the Financial Advisory Roundtable of the Federal Reserve Bank of New York, and a Fellow of The American Academy of Arts and Sciences. He was the President of The American Finance Association for 2009. He has served on the editorial board of many journals, including Econometrica. In 2003, Duffie was awarded the SunGard/IAFE Financial Engineer of the Year Award from the International Association of Financial Engineers.

He holds a Ph.D. (1984) in Engineering Economic Systems from Stanford University, a Master of Economics (1980) from the University of New England (Australia), and a Bachelor of Science in Engineering (Civil Engineering) (1975) from the University of New Brunswick.

References

External links
Stanford GSB Faculty Profile
Personal Homepage

Living people
Financial economists
21st-century American economists
Canadian economists
Stanford University alumni
Stanford University Graduate School of Business faculty
Fellows of the Econometric Society
1954 births
University of New England (Australia) alumni
Fellows of the American Academy of Arts and Sciences
Hoover Institution people
Presidents of the American Finance Association